Bulag is a rural locality (an ulus) in Kurumkansky District, Republic of Buryatia, Russia. The population was 118 as of 2010.

Geography 
Bulag is located 39 km southeast of Kurumkan (the district's administrative centre) by road. Kharamodun is the nearest rural locality.

References 

Rural localities in Kurumkansky District